Mirrored Media is an experiential marketing firm. Based in Santa Monica, California, the company creates online and offline marketing campaigns with brands, musical artists and influencers.

History
Mirrored Media was founded in 2010 by Justin Lefkovitch who brought in partners Hans Zimmer, Steve Kofsky and Vaden Saunders. The company chose the name Mirrored Media to summarize a core mission of mirroring a brand's ideal while remaining true to an artist's vision.

Since its launch, Mirrored Media has built and activated music-based marketing campaigns for brands including Acura, Coach, mophie, 20th Century Fox, TNT Turner, Bacardi, Fullscreen, CraveOnline, TuneCore, Syfy, Lively, the House of Rock, and Hyatt International Hotels.

Awards and recognition
 The Inc. 5000 - Inc. Magazine's 35th Annual List of America's Fastest-Growing Private Companies, 2016
 Summit Creative Award, 2016
 IT Award, Event Marketers Top 100, 2016
 IT Award, Event Marketers Top 100, 2015

References

External links 
 Mirrored Media Official Website

Companies based in Santa Monica, California